Anax (from Ancient Greek  , "lord, master, king") is a genus of dragonflies in the family Aeshnidae. It includes species such as the emperor dragonfly, Anax imperator.

Anax spp. are very large dragonflies. They generally have light-colored bodies and dark tails with pale markings.

Some species are migratory (Anax junius).

Species
The genus Anax includes these species:
Anax amazili  – Amazon darner
Anax bangweuluensis  – swamp emperor
Anax chloromelas  – dark emperor
Anax concolor  – blue-spotted comet darner
Anax congoliath 
Anax ephippiger  – vagrant emperor
Anax fumosus 
Anax georgius  – Kimberley emperor
Anax gladiator  – swordbearer emperor
Anax gibbosulus  – green emperor
Anax guttatus  – lesser green emperor
Anax immaculifrons  – magnificent emperor
Anax imperator  – emperor dragonfly, blue emperor
Anax indicus  – elephant emperor
Anax junius  – common green darner
Anax longipes  – comet darner
Anax maclachlani 
Anax mandrakae 
Anax nigrofasciatus  – blue-spotted emperor
Anax panybeus 
Anax papuensis Burmeister, 1839 – Australian emperor
Anax parthenope  – lesser emperor
Anax piraticus 
Anax pugnax 
Anax selysi 
Anax speratus  – orange emperor
Anax strenuus  – giant Hawaiian darner, pinao
Anax tristis  – black emperor, magnificent emperor
Anax tumorifer 
Anax walsinghami  – giant darner

Taxonomic history
The genus Anax was described by William Elford Leach in 1815 when he published  in Brewster's Edinburgh Encyclopedia.

References

Aeshnidae
Anisoptera genera
Odonata of Australia
Odonata of Oceania
Odonata of New Zealand
Taxa named by William Elford Leach